Planonasus is a genus of ground sharks in the family Pseudotriakidae, native to the western Indian Ocean.

Species 
There are currently two species in this genus:

 P. parini (Weigmann, Stehmann & Thiel, 2013) (dwarf false catshark)
 P. indicus (Ebert, Akhilesh, & Weigmann, 2018) (pygmy false catshark)

References 

 
Shark genera